Donna Skelly is a Canadian politician, who was elected to the Legislative Assembly of Ontario in the 2018 provincial election. She represents the riding of Flamborough—Glanbrook as a member of the Progressive Conservative Party of Ontario. Skelly currently serves as Deputy Speaker, and was previously the Parliamentary Assistant to the Attorney General and is a member of the Select Committee on Emergency Management Oversight and the Standing Committee on Justice Policy. She served as a Parliamentary Assistant to the Minister of Economic Development, Job Creation and Trade between June 2018 and October 2021. Prior to her election to the legislature, Skelly was the city councillor for Ward 7 on Hamilton, Ontario City Council, and before that she was a television news anchor at CHCH-TV in Hamilton, Ontario.

Provincial politics 
Following her victory in the 2018 Ontario general election, Skelly said that her priorities as Flamborough—Glanbrook's member of provincial parliament included ending hallway healthcare, lowering hydro bills and respecting taxpayers.

In March 2019, Skelly introduced a motion in the Legislative Assembly of Ontario to encourage clothing donation. Skelly said the move was an effort to combat the negative environmental impacts of fast fashion.

During the COVID-19 pandemic in Ontario, Skelly launched a website called Relief Within Reach to connect local small businesses with available provincial and federal support programs. The initiative was praised by members of Hamilton City Council.

Skelly was re-elected by a wide margin in the 2022 Ontario general election.

Municipal politics 
In 2016, Skelly won a by-election to represent Ward 7 on Hamilton, Ontario City Council following outgoing councillor Scott Duvall's election to the Parliament of Canada. The ward was Hamilton's largest at the time, with 60,000 residents.

Throughout her time on council, Skelly was a frequent advocate for the responsible use of taxpayer dollars.

Media career 
Prior to entering politics, Skelly had a 30 year career in broadcast journalism. She produced and hosted the current affairs program Square Off on Hamilton based CHCH News. During her time in media, Skelly advocated before the CRTC and parliamentary committees for the value in supporting local news. She also held leadership roles in her union, serving as president of the employee bargaining unit.

Election results

References

Progressive Conservative Party of Ontario MPPs
21st-century Canadian politicians
Living people
21st-century Canadian women politicians
Women MPPs in Ontario
Politicians from Greater Sudbury
Hamilton, Ontario city councillors
Canadian television news anchors
Canadian women television journalists
Canadian television reporters and correspondents
Women municipal councillors in Canada
1961 births